"Everybody's Gotta Live" is a song written by the American musician Arthur Lee. It was performed by Lee and released as a single in June 1972, coupled with the track "Love Jumped Through My Window"; both tracks also appeared that year on Lee's album Vindicator.

"Everybody's Gotta Live" was later re-recorded and released on the 1974 album Reel to Real by the rock band Love, a group in which Lee served as frontman.

A cover version by rapper and singer Mac Miller, simply titled "Everybody", was released on Miller's posthumous 2020 album Circles.

Release
"Everybody's Gotta Live" was written, performed and recorded by Lee, and released in June 1972 as a 45-rpm disc single, with "Love Jumped Through My Window" as its B-side. Both tracks were also released that year on Lee's album Vindicator. In 1974, a re-recording of "Everybody's Gotta Live" appeared on the album Reel to Real by Love.

Reception
In 2022, Eoghan Lyng of Far Out Magazine called the song "[a] meditation on harmony", in which Lee "exposes the beauty of the world in a series of damning strokes. Sunlight must always follow darkness [...] The composition remains one of Lee's most evocative and impactful, growing in popularity like the canon it represented."

In popular culture
The version of the song by Love was featured in the 2019 film Jojo Rabbit.

References

1972 songs
Songs written by Arthur Lee (musician)
Love (band) songs